Valursfossen (English: Valur Falls) is a waterfall in the municipality of Eidfjord in the county of Vestland, Norway. It is part of the river Veig, where it runs down from the mountain plateau Hardangervidda and down into the valley Valursdalen. It has a total descent of 272 m.

References

See also 
 Valursfossen in World Waterfall Database

Waterfalls of Vestland
Eidfjord